Bruno Palazzo (born 18 November 2000) is an Argentine professional footballer who plays as a centre-back for Gimnasia La Plata.

Career
Palazzo had a spell with Everton La Plata before joining Gimnasia y Esgrima in 2016. He was promoted into their reserve squad in September 2019, featuring in a fixture with River Plate on 27 September. Palazzo made the breakthrough into Gimnasia's first-team in December 2020, initially appearing on the substitute's bench for a defeat to Banfield on 21 December in the Copa de la Liga Profesional. He made his senior debut in that competition on 28 December against Talleres under caretaker managers Mariano Messera and Leandro Martini, subsequently scoring after replacing José Paradela at half-time.

Career statistics
.

Notes

References

External links

2000 births
Living people
Argentine people of Italian descent
Footballers from La Plata
Argentine footballers
Association football defenders
Argentine Primera División players
Club de Gimnasia y Esgrima La Plata footballers